Club Run was an informal name for aircraft ferry operations from Gibraltar to Malta during the Siege of Malta in the Second World War. Malta was half-way between Gibraltar to Alexandria and had the only harbour controlled by the British in the area. Malta had docks, repair facilities, reserves and stores, which had been built up since the cession of the island to Britain in 1814. Malta had become an important staging post for aircraft and a base for air reconnaissance over the central Mediterranean. The Axis powers Italy and Germany made several attempts from 1941 to 1942 to either force the British military authorities on the island to surrender or to destroy its effectiveness as a military base. The island was a forward base from which Axis supplies to their North African armies could be attacked. It is a measure of Malta's importance that Britain reassigned fighter aircraft from home defence.

Ferry missions were covered by Force H, based at Gibraltar (called The Club), consisting of the battlecruiser , aircraft carrier , light cruiser  and the E and F-class destroyers of the 8th Flotilla. Its Mediterranean operations were called Club Runs. It was deemed to be an exclusive club of the most efficient warships in the Royal Navy. A mythical "regimental tie" was designed for members of "The Club", consisting of a Mediterranean grey field, scattered with raspberries.

Malta's air defences were essential and aircraft reinforcements and replacements were a constant need. Fighters (Hawker Hurricanes and Supermarine Spitfires) and torpedo bombers (Fairey Swordfish and Fairey Albacores) were required but they lacked the range to fly direct from the British base at Gibraltar. The solution was for aircraft carriers to move within range for the fighters to fly off and land at a Maltese airfield.

At the outbreak of war, the opinion of the Chiefs of Staff was that Malta was indefensible and this view was supported by a later review, "there is nothing practicable that we can do to increase the powers of resistance of Malta". Winston Churchill disagreed. In July 1940, he insisted that Hurricanes be flown in "at the earliest moment". This led to the first Club Run, Operation Hurry, using the antiquated .

The Axis air forces developed measures to counter the Club Runs, attacking the aircraft while in transit and catching them on the ground before they could be armed and refuelled. Forty of the Spitfires delivered by the United States Navy carrier  (Operation Calendar) were destroyed on the ground but in the following operation (Operation Bowery) the Luftwaffe were outwitted and British fighters were airborne and ready for their opponents.

In their turn, the carriers became prime targets and required more heavily protected and complex operations to ensure success. Despite this, the British carrier Ark Royal was sunk and the American carrier Wasp was loaned for Club Runs in April and May 1942. Aircraft losses over Malta were such that the replenishment Club Runs became a constant conveyor belt of aircraft ferried to Gibraltar, where they were transferred to carriers for flying off while more were ferried from Britain. Additional capacity was created by transporting aircraft in crates and assembling them at Gibraltar or on board carriers. In this way, one ferry run from Britain would deliver enough aircraft for two flying-off operations.

From early 1942, Spitfires were necessary to counter the more modern German fighters that outclassed the robust but outdated Hurricanes. On several occasions there were faults with the external fuel tanks that were needed to give the required range. As a result, two Club Runs were aborted and had to be repeated after modifications at Gibraltar, Calendar delivered inadequately prepared aircraft that fell prey to bombing on Malta and Bowery′s 64 Spitfires required adaptations to the external fuel tanks while on board USS Wasp. The failure to rectify a fault over several deliveries for a critical purpose in hazardous circumstances is unexplained but was described as "embarrassing".

List of Club Run operations

 August 1940 - Operation Hurry: 12 Hurricanes flown off HMS Argus
 November 1940 - Operation Coat: off HMS Ark Royal 3 Fulmars for HMS Illustrious
 November 1940 - Operation White: 12 Hurricanes flown off Argus, 8 lost en route after running out of fuel

 April 1941 - Operation Winch: 12 Hurricane IIs flown off Ark Royal
 April 1941 - Operation Dunlop: 22 Hurricanes flown off Ark Royal
 May 1941 - Operation Splice: 48 Hurricane IIs flown off Furious and Ark Royal
 June 1941 - Operation Rocket: 35 Hurricane IIs flown off Furious and Ark Royal
 June 1941 - Operation Tracer: HMS Ark Royal and Victorious flew off 47 Hurricanes to Malta
 June 1941 - Operation Railway I: 22 Hurricanes flown off Ark Royal
 June 1941 - Operation Railway II: 35 Hurricanes off Ark Royal and Furious (7 not launched due to deck accident)

 September 1941 - Operation Status I: 26 Hurricanes flown off Ark Royal
 September 1941 - Operation Status II: 46 Hurricanes flown off Ark Royal and Furious
 October 1941 - Operation Callboy: 11 Albacores and 2 Swordfish flown off Ark Royal
 November 1941 - Operation Perpetual: 37 Hurricanes flown off Ark Royal and Argus (10–12 November 1941) 
 February 1942 - Operation Spotter I: 15 Spitfire Mk VBs off HMS Eagle. Operation was aborted due to fuel tank fault on the Spitfires and the carrier arrived back in Gibraltar on 28 February
 March 1942 - Operation Spotter II: the 15 repaired Spitfire Mk VBs flown off Eagle on 7 March.
 March 1942 - Operation Picket I: 9 Spitfires off Eagle aborted due to fuel tank fault
 March 1942 - Operation Picket II: 7 Spitfires flown off Eagle and Argus; 6 Albacores unable to fly off Argus
 April 1942 - Operation Calendar: 48 Spitfires flown off from USS Wasp
 May 1942 - Operation Bowery 64 Spitfires: flown off USS Wasp and HMS Eagle (61 arrived).
 May 1942 - Operation LB: 17 Spitfires flown off Eagle; 6 Albacores again failed to fly off
 June 1942 - Operation Style: 32 Spitfires flown off HMS Eagle. Twenty-eight of them arrived safely, four shot down en route.
 June 1942 – Operation Salient: 32 Spitfires from HMS Eagle
 June 1942 - Operation Pinpoint: 31 Spitfires flown off Eagle
 July 1942 - Operation Insect: 28 Spitfires flown off Eagle
 August 1942 - Operation Bellows: 39 Spitfires flown off Furious
 August 1942 - Operation Baritone: 32 Spitfires flown off Furious
 October 1942 – Operation Train: 29 Spitfires flown off Furious

See also
 Malta Convoys
 Siege of Malta (World War II)

References

Notes

Bibliography

External links
 Spitfire deployment in 1942

Battle of the Mediterranean
Malta Convoys
Naval battles and operations of the European theatre of World War II